Tunku Abdul Rahman formed the second Rahman cabinet after being invited by Tuanku Abdul Rahman to begin a new government following the 19 August 1959 general election in the Federation of Malaya. Prior to the election, Rahman led (as Prime Minister) the first Rahman cabinet, a coalition government that consisted of members of the component parties of Alliance Party. It was the 2nd cabinet of Malaysia formed since independence.

The cabinet was sworn in on 22 August 1959 and Rahman assumed the office of Prime Minister from Abdul Razak Hussein who was the Acting Prime Minister after Rahman took a three-month leave of office to campaign for the elections.

All federal ministers from the First Rahman cabinet were retained with the exception of H.S. Lee who did not contest the 1959 elections and Mohd Khir Johari who was contesting in the constituency of Kedah Tengah, where elections had been postponed to 30 September 1959.

This is a list of the members of the second cabinet of the first Prime Minister of Malaysia (then Prime Minister of the Federation of Malaya), Tunku Abdul Rahman.

Composition

Full members
The federal cabinet consisted of the following ministers:

First reshuffle (November 1959 – 1961)

Full members

Assistant ministers

Second reshuffle (1961 – 1962)

Full members

Assistant ministers

Third reshuffle (1962 – )

Full members

Assistant ministers

Composition before cabinet dissolution

Full members

Assistant ministers

See also
 Members of the Dewan Rakyat, 1st Malayan Parliament

References

Cabinet of Malaysia
1959 establishments in Malaya
1964 disestablishments in Malaysia
Cabinets established in 1959
Cabinets disestablished in 1964